is a registered museum in Sano, Tochigi Prefecture, Japan that opened with the merger of Kuzū into Sano in 2005. The collection and displays relate to the geology and natural history of the area, with a particular focus on local fossil finds. Species represented include Palaeoloxodon naumanni, Stephanorhinus kirchbergensis, and Sinomegaceros yabei.

See also

 List of fossil mammals of Japan

References

External links
  Kuzū Fossil Museum

Museums in Tochigi Prefecture
Sano, Tochigi
Natural history museums in Japan
Fossil museums
Museums established in 2005
2005 establishments in Japan